"Get a Haircut" is a rock song by American band George Thorogood & the Destroyers. It was released as a single from the 1993 album Haircut. The song was written by Bill Birch and David Avery. It peaked at No. 2 on the US Album Rock Tracks chart on August 28, 1993, and became a top-30 hit in both Australia (No. 28) and New Zealand (No. 15). "Get a Haircut" was the No. 1 most played song in Canada on FM radio.

"Get a Haircut" has since become one of Thorogood's signature songs and has become a staple of classic rock radio. The music video for this song was animated by David Feiss, the creator of the Cartoon Network animated series Cow and Chicken and I Am Weasel.

Background
Thorogood recalls being at a club in Australia called the Black Marlin watching some of the performers. He liked "Get a Haircut", asked them who wrote it and decided to cover it. Thorogood began playing the song in 1970, but only decided to record it in 1992 because he had trouble getting the riff down in the studio.

Charts

References

1993 singles
1993 songs
EMI America Records singles
George Thorogood songs